Throughout its history the Metropolitan Opera has taken a leading role at introducing both original stage works to the world and bringing works from around the globe to the United States for the first time. The following is a list of works that have premiered at the Met. All works are operas unless otherwise stated.

World premieres

United States premieres

References

Sources
 Metropolitan Opera archives

Metropolitan Opera
 
Lists of superlatives